The Ethridge House is a historic house located at 401 Louise Street in Colfax, Louisiana, in an old neighborhood by the Red River levee.

Built in 1900 by T.Q. Long and sold to Emuel Allen Ethridge in 1907, the house it is a "retardataire" Greek Revival residence, backward-looking in its architectural style for its age. It is a -story frame cottage.

The house was listed on the National Register of Historic Places on August 7, 1989.

See also
National Register of Historic Places listings in Grant Parish, Louisiana

References

Houses on the National Register of Historic Places in Louisiana
Greek Revival architecture in Louisiana
Houses completed in 1900
Grant Parish, Louisiana